Zimuto Siding  pronounced correctly as ZeeMooToe Siding, is named in the ChiKaranga language spoken locally after Chief Zimuto in whose area it is located. Zi is a word prefix denoting large size, and Muto is a noun meaning soup. So literally Zimuto means a large amount of soup. The colonial settlers named the siding after the local chief Zimuto but due to their poor understanding of the pronunciation wrote the name as they would pronounce it and not as it is actually pronounced. The name Zimutu was put down as the official name and appears on some old maps and on rail road documents. It is meaningless and led to confusion as locals spelt is as Zimuto, and the settlers spelt as Zimutu. After independence in 1980, most local names were revised and spelt correctly. Because many documents were generated during the colonial years, researchers must always assume that Zimutu is the same place as Zimuto.

Brief 
Zimuto Siding is a small railroad stop over place in the Masvingo Province of Zimbabwe. It is located north of Masvingo on the Masvingo-Gweru railway line. It was developed as a siding initially before being commercialised. It is as old as the railway line itself and was strategically chosen to serve as a watering hole for the then steam locomotives used as rail power, and requiring water top-ups along the journey.

  
 Altitude: over 1300m (has not yet been read but will be found on the a peg on railway line)
 Masvingo to Gweru railway line passes through and it is the second stop from Masvingo going north. It used to be a watering hole for the steam trains 
 The nearest airport is at Masvingo though almost nobody in this region uses it.

Income 
Most people in the area are on subsistence incomes supplemented by family members working in the cities or abroad. It would be very difficult for a family to live entirely from wages earned at a place such as Zimuto siding.

Rainfall 
The mean rainfall is  631 mm per annum.  Successive droughts have affected the local habitat and local economy.

Literacy rates 
Literacy rates remain high at over 90%. Most people speak at least two languages including English, so that a traveller is never lost. However, because the local language, Shona, is a fast language, people speak English just as fast and that may cause visitors some initial difficulty.

Foods 
Local diet consists of a variety of foodstuffs. Rural Zimbabwe consumes little meat. They also eat more fresh foods and fruit. The main challenge in rural Zimbabwe is food preservation. Most food is produced during one or other season and needs to be preserved so that it is available throughout the year. New and cheap methods of increasing the efficiency of preservation are always welcome to locals.

 Sadza made from maize meal, rapocco meal or sorghum meal is the staple diet
 vegetables such as can be grown in the family garden. You will notice each family grows its own and they pick only when they need for the day. They also eat vegetables such as pumpkin leaves, some wild vegetables such as munyovhi, mowa,  mubvunzandadya, marenge. as well as some tree leaves such as mulberry tree. 
 Meat such as chicken, beef, lamb, and game. most families keep their own chickens and domestic animals.
 Fruit: there is a wide variety of fruit such as mangoes, guavas, oranges, lemons, apples, etc., and some wild fruit which, like any other fruit are seasonal.
  
The increase of poverty since 1998 has restricted the diet further.

Water sources 
Zimuto Siding was chosen as a Siding because it is naturally wet ground and the ground water  level is not far from the surface. This allowed steam trains to be watered all year round.

Health 
The Zimuto rural population has not been spared from the AIDS epidemic that has swept the country. Most families have lost one or more members.  The children are also prone to other diseases.  The mission clinic at Zimuto mission, Copota, down the railway line towards Masvingo serves the area well.  The government's primary health care system has raised the level of health education in the area.  Problems with poor nutrition have limited health progress over the years.  The clinic at Zimuto Siding is reportedly giving not enough services because they charge the poor people for the health services. The government is expected to intervene in that problem, however, with the economic meltdown in Zimbabwe the situation in this rural place might get worse.

References 

 http://www.aciar.gov.au/web.nsf/att/JFRN-6BN9C2/$file/proc115.pdf
 Zimbabwe National Railways reference pegs
 http://www.satelliteviews.net/cgi-bin/w.cgi?c=zi&AF=R_Z
 http://rumbletum.org/Africa/Zimbabwe/Zimbabwe+(general)/_878657_Zimutu.html#themap
 http://www.satelliteviews.net/cgi-bin/w.cgi?c=zi&UF=-2324024&UN=-3206258&AF=R_Z
 http://rumbletum.org/Africa/Zimbabwe/Zimbabwe+(general)/_878657_Zimutu.html#themap
 https://web.archive.org/web/20071102091656/http://www.weather.co.zw:80/inside.cfm?pid=14

Masvingo Province
Populated places in Zimbabwe